Kantilo is a census town in Nayagarh district in the Indian state of Odisha. Kantilo is famous for bell metal utensil, but nowadays it is losing its sheen.

Geography 
It has an average elevation of 65 metres (213 feet).

Demographics 
 India census, Kantilo had a population of 8728. Males constitute 51% of the population and females 49%. Kantilo has an average literacy rate of 72%, higher than the national average of 59.5%: male literacy is 80%, and female literacy is 64%. In Kantilo, 11% of the population is under 6 years of age.

Places of interest 
 Nilamadhav Temple, Narayani Temple, Largest coast of Mahanadi

Language 
Although the people of kantilo speak odiya, Hindi and English is also well understood by them.

References 

Cities and towns in Nayagarh district